TeaGschwendner is a chain of retail shops and European bistros which sell loose leaf tea and tea accessories. The company started in Germany in 1978 and now operates in seven countries on four continents including two locations in the United States.

As it stands today, TeaGschwendner is a privately owned tea merchant in the field of tea brokers. Coming out in the public markets in 2008 at the World Tea Expo, TeaGschwendner was the highest ranked tea merchant with 27/30 judged teas in a top three respective category; comparably, the next competing company, Rishi Tea, was closer to 13/30. As of 2008, TeaGschwendner tea is also being sold by independently owned small businesses, namely, TeaHaus in Ann Arbor, MI.

References

External links 
 Company website

Tea brands
Tea houses
Tea companies of Germany